

History
Until the 1970s, students from primary schools in the village of Felpham attended secondary schools in the nearby town of Bognor Regis. A secondary school was opened in Felpham in 1974/5 as Felpham Comprehensive School. In 1978 it accommodated around 800 pupils and in 1980 the initial intake of pupils had reached the sixth form. The neighbouring Arun Leisure Centre was also completed at this time with the School sharing its sports facilities. The school was renamed as Felpham Community College in c.1991 by which time pupil number had risen to around 1300.

An unnamed Student of Felpham Community College in 2012 was successful in taking part in a world record for  The Guinness Book of Records. The attempt was for 'most spaghetti eaten in 10 minutes'. The record took place in the schools cafeteria, which has now been nicknamed 'the spaghet arena' by students of the school. However, the school discredits this.

Campus
The college is sited on a campus which it shares with the local leisure centre (Arun Leisure Centre).

Notable former pupils
Danny Hollands, footballer
Ben Richards, actor, best known for his role in ITV's Footballer's Wives

External links
 Felpham Community College website
 Felpham Community College Moodle

References

1974 establishments in England
Educational institutions established in 1974
Community schools in West Sussex
Secondary schools in West Sussex